Victoria, officially the Municipality of Victoria, is a 5th class municipality in the province of Northern Samar, Philippines. According to the 2020 census, it has a population of 15,361 people.

It borders with the town of Allen in the north and San Isidro in the southwest.

Geography

Barangays
Victoria is politically subdivided into 16 barangays.

Climate

Demographics

Economy

Local government
Elected officials:
 Mayor: Jose Ardales
 Vice Mayor: Arnel C. Siago
 Councilors:
 Jorge Ardales
 Jonay Sabido
 Anselmo Aliluya
 Rufino Subiaga
 Fe Viloria
 Eugenio Laurente
 Marcos Porteles
 Jude rey Lucinario

References

External links
 [ Philippine Standard Geographic Code]
 Philippine Census Information
 Local Governance Performance Management System

Municipalities of Northern Samar